The Targa New Zealand is a tarmac rally held annually on public roads typically throughout the North Island of New Zealand. The main Targa each year begins in the last week of October and is a week-long event which covers around 1500 km of touring and 750 km of closed special stages.  Smaller one- or two-day events are usually run during the year and have been variously titled Targa Bambina, Targa Dash, Targa Rotorua, Targa Tauranga and Targa Hawkes Bay.
In 2014 Targa New Zealand for the first time was held in the South Island of New Zealand. Starting in Christchurch and finishing in Cromwell (Near Queenstown) the rally included every South Island race track including New Zealand's latest - Highlands Motorsport Park.
Noticeable stages included Queenstown's Crown Range which is understood to be one of New Zealand's highest altitude public roads.

Originally intended as an event for owners of classic performance cars to display and race their vehicles, it has evolved into a serious competition event with modern purpose built race cars usually taking top honours.

The race started in 1995 and continually growing in popularity with over 200 cars entering the 2005 Dunlop sponsored Targa rally.

Racing is divided into classes to give everyone a chance of honours of some sort. These classes are based around age and engine size of the vehicles. Younger drivers are encouraged to compete in a controlled manner in a safe environment. Crashes happen but it is a very low percentage. Race cars need to have roll cages and safety gear except the Targa tour for first-time competitors. They drive under the guidance of the tour leader. Local groups providing hospitality areas, fundraising activities such as car washes, barbecues and 4000 lunches. 

Classes for Early Targa Events
Historic
Pre-classic
Classic
Post classic
Metalman super classics
Metalman all-comers
Early modern
Honda riders contemporary
Super GT

Classes for Current Targa Events

Classic 2WD
Category 1 0 – 2000cc Aftermarket sequential gearboxes are prohibited
Category 2 2001 – 3400cc Aftermarket sequential gearboxes are prohibited
Category 3 3401cc and over Aftermarket sequential gearboxes are prohibited
Production (GT2) 2WD
Category 4 0 – 2000cc Aftermarket sequential gearboxes are prohibited
Category 5 2001 – 3400cc Aftermarket sequential gearboxes are prohibited
Category 6 3401cc and over Aftermarket sequential gearboxes are prohibited
Production (GT4) 4WD
Category 8 Pre 2000 1st year of production prior to 1 January 2000. Aftermarket sequential gearboxes are prohibited
Category 9 Post 2000 1st year of production after to 1 January 2000. Aftermarket sequential gearboxes are prohibited
Allcomers (Extreme) 2WD and 4WD
Category 7 Open 2WD All 2 wheel drive vehicles not eligible for Categories 1–6.
Category 10 Open 4WD All 4 wheel drive vehicles not eligible for Categories 8-9.

Past winners

Multiple Winners

Driver

Co-Driver

Manufacturer

Well known Targa entrants

Jim Richards
Tony Quinn
Chris Amon
Murray Walker
Peter Brock
Grant Dalton
Steve Millen

References

External links

Rally competitions in New Zealand
Recurring events established in 1995